Bill (1973) is a compilation album of previously released material by Bill Cosby. All the routines are edited down compared to their original appearances on previous albums, some slightly, some considerably.

Track listing
Handball At The "Y"  – 3:38
"Froofie" The Dog  – 4:15
Survival  – 2:56
Fernet Branca – 7:55
Snakes and Alligators – 2:34
Track and Field/High Jump – 5:33
Ennis' Toilet – 1:31
My Brother, Russell – 3:04
Masculinity At Its Finest – 5:53
Wally, Wally – 3:39
My Dad's Car – 4:52
The Lower Track – 2:13
(In Las Vegas) Be Good To Your Wives – 4:03
(In Las Vegas) Bill Cosby Fights Back – 4:23
Buck Jones – 5:13
Bill Cosby's First Baby – 5:17
Basketball – 3:20
Fat Albert's Car – 5:19

References

Bill Cosby compilation albums
Spoken word albums by American artists
Live spoken word albums
1973 compilation albums
MCA Records compilation albums
1970s comedy albums